The Merchants Exchange Building was a building at Third Street at Chestnut and Pine in St. Louis, Missouri, from 1875 to 1958 that housed the St. Louis Merchants Exchange and hosted the 1876 Democratic National Convention.

The building was designed by Francis Lee and Thomas Annan who placed second in a competition for the structure (the winner was George I. Barnett but his work was considered too expensive.

The building was the second Merchants Exchange on the location. The first building was built in 1857. During the American Civil War members of the exchange split along North-South lines. The Exchange merged back together after the war.

At the same time of its construction the Merchants Exchange built the Eads Bridge across the Mississippi River.

The building was torn down in 1958. Part of the Adam's Mark Hotel was built in its location. In 2008 the Adams Mark announced plans to become a Grand Hyatt.

The Merchants Exchange founded in 1836 was the first commodity trading exchange in the United States—predating the Chicago Board of Trade. In its early years it was referred to as the Chamber of Commerce. Articles about the 1876 Convention referred to it as the Chamber of Commerce. After vacating its downtown location, it was evicted in 1995 from its new location by eminent domain when St. Louis expanded the St. Louis Science Center. The Exchange made a last gasp in 2000/2001 to conduct computerized trading of future trading of freight on the Mississippi River. It has quietly ceased operation.

References

stlcin.missouri.org history of building

Buildings and structures in St. Louis
Commercial buildings in Missouri
Demolished buildings and structures in St. Louis
Buildings and structures demolished in 1958